The 2008 Gael Linn Cup, the most important representative competition for elite level participants in the women's team field sport of camogie, was won by Connacht, who defeated Munster in the final, played at Ashbourne .

Arrangements
Connacht ran up a record points total for themselves in beating Ulster 1–28 to 0–7 in the semi-final while Munster defeated Leinster 3–14 to 2–14. Jessica Gill and Veronica Curtin were the stars of the Connacht side which won their fourth title and first for eight years, beating Munster 1–14 to 2–10. Daragh Ó Conchúir reported:  Connacht led by 0–7 to 0–5 at half-time but the game really sprung to life two minutes after the restart when Tipperary's Geraldine Kinnane goaled to open up a 1–7 to 0–6 lead for Munster. Midway through the half, the sides were deadlocked as Connacht rallied to draw level at 0–10 to 1–7 before Jessica Gill found the net from a free with seven minutes remaining. Síle Burns netted with a last-minute goal for Munster as Connacht hung on for the victory.

Gael Linn Trophy
Munster defeated Leinster 4–6 to 1–12. Ulster defeated Connacht 2–11 to 1–6. Munster defeated Ulster 3–17 to 0–3 in the final.

Final stages

|}

Junior Final

|}

References

External links
 Camogie Association

Gael Linn Cup seasons
2008 in camogie